Doobious Sources is a 2017 American comedy film directed by Clif Lord, starring Jason Weissbrod and Jeff Lorch.

Cast
 Jason Weissbrod as Zorn Tappadapo
 Jeff Lorch as Reginald Block-Hunsleigh
 Creagen Dow as Ky Kittridge
 Joe Cortese as Magnus Martindale
 Edward James Gage as Evander Bagby
 Dan Warner as Greg Newman
 Mark Costello as Blake Morgan
 Henry LeBlanc as Mayor Simon Jessup
 Dave Shalansky as Mr. X
 Patrick O'Connor as Ritchie Pagosi
 Kara Luiz as Megan Jessup
 Maggie Rowe as Dr. Laura Ingall
 Brynn Thayer as Josie Martindale
 Ilya Jordanov as Bart Hosing

Release
The film premiered at the Maine Cannabis Film Festival on 2 January 2017, where it won the Golden Leaf award.

Reception
Michael Rechtshaffen of the Los Angeles Times called the film "wildly unfunny".

Edward Douglas of Film Journal International wrote that the film does not contain "anything even remotely funny".

Frank Scheck of The Hollywood Reporter wrote that the film "manages to take the fun out of smoking pot."

References

External links
 
 

American comedy films
2017 comedy films